Tough Guys (Italian: Noi duri) is a 1960 Italian comedy film directed by Camillo Mastrocinque and starring Fred Buscaglione, Totò, Paolo Panelli and Scilla Gabel.

Cast

References

Bibliography
 Forgacs, David & Gundle, Stephen. Mass Culture and Italian Society from Fascism to the Cold War. Indiana University Press, 2007.

External links

1960 films
1960 comedy films
Italian comedy films
1960s Italian-language films
Films directed by Camillo Mastrocinque
Films scored by Lallo Gori
1960s Italian films